The Gallatin Fossil Plant is a coal and natural gas-fired power plant near Gallatin, Tennessee operated by the Tennessee Valley Authority (TVA). The plant was originally entirely a coal-fired plant, constructed in the 1950s, and natural gas units were added later.

Description
The Gallatin Fossil Plant is located on 1,950 acres of land on the Cumberland River The plant consists of four coal-fired units, with a combined generating capacity of 976 net megawatts (MW). The plant contains four Westinghouse and four GE combustion turbine units, with a combined capacity of 600 MW net, and these units, located adjacent to the coal units, are  sometimes referred to separately from the coal units as the Gallatin Combustine Turbine Plant.

History 
Gallatin was originally entirely a coal-fired plant. Groundbreaking for the plant occurred on May 11, 1953. Unit one began operation on November 8, 1956, unit two on June 27, 1957, unit three on May 22, 1959, and unit four on August 9, 1959. The first four gas-fired units was added in 1975, and the last four in 2000. Electrostatic precipitators were first installed on the plant in 1970. In 2019, TVA agreed to remove 12 million tons of coal ash at a cost of $640 million during 20 years.

References

Energy infrastructure completed in 1956
Energy infrastructure completed in 1957
Energy infrastructure completed in 1959
Energy infrastructure completed in 1975
Energy infrastructure completed in 2000
Coal-fired power stations in Tennessee
Tennessee Valley Authority
Buildings and structures in Sumner County, Tennessee
1956 establishments in Tennessee